Hopeful Baptist Church is a historic church in Keysville, Georgia. It was added to the National Register of Historic Places on January 11, 1993. It is located on Winter Road east of the junction with Blythe Road.

It is a classic Greek Revival, monumental, temple-like building built during 1850–51, and the church is notable for having both white and black members, before the American Civil War.

It is made of George longleaf yellow pine (heart pine), on a brick foundation. It has four masonry front porch columns supporting a large pediment in the front gable. It has an entablature and pilasters and two door openings in the front (north-facing) facade. It has five windows on each side and two on the south end, all windows being original, large 16-pane over 16-pane windows.

See also
 National Register of Historic Places listings in Burke County, Georgia

References

Baptist churches in Georgia (U.S. state)
Properties of religious function on the National Register of Historic Places in Georgia (U.S. state)
Buildings and structures in Burke County, Georgia